Çərəli (also, Charali, Chareli, and Chereli) is a village in the Qubadli Rayon of Azerbaijan.

References 

Populated places in Qubadli District